Barnsley Independent Group is a British political party in Barnsley, England.

The party was founded in January 2006 by a group of former Labour councillors on Barnsley Metropolitan Borough Council. At that time they had seven councillors, and in the local elections that May they fielded 17 candidates. They have contested council elections since.

Structure
The party leader is Phillip Birkinshaw, but there are no whips and membership is only open to councillors and candidates, which the party says is to prevent influence from being exerted in the background by a party structure or powerful individuals. All candidates pay their own expenses.

Elections
After the 2007 elections the Group had 22 councillors, and 24 after the 2008 elections. 
Despite threatening to overtake Labour as the largest party on Barnsley Council in 2008, BIG's fortunes have dramatically altered, being reduced to 5 councillors after suffering massive losses in the 2012 Local Elections, and with the Group only able to field 5 candidates in 2015 and reduced to four councillors in 2016. The Group was further reduced at the 2018 local elections, fielding just two candidates in the Dodworth and Stairfoot wards, losing in both and being reduced to two councillors (Philip Birkinshaw in Dodworth and Gill Carr in Worsbrough-both next up for election in 2020).

References

External links

Locally based political parties in England
Political parties established in 2006
Politics of Barnsley
2006 establishments in England